"The Boy with the X-Ray Eyes" is a song by Babylon Zoo, released in October 1996 as the third and final single from their debut album of the same name. The release was a failure, continuing a downward trend in chart positions for the group's singles and peaking at #32 on the UK Singles Chart. It marked Babylon Zoo's final appearance in the UK Top 40.

The single version was a new edit of the song, remixed by Arthur Baker. Each CD version (including the two promos) has a different colour sleeve and disc.

Reception
Select critic Ian Harrison wrote that the song "mixes showtune sensibilities with generic Beatles theft".

Track listing

CD Promo Single 1996 EMI (CDEMDJ 440)
The Boy with the X-Ray Eyes (7" Mix)

CD Promo Single  1996 EMI (CDEMDJX 440)
The Boy with the X-Ray Eyes (7" Mix)
The Boy with the X-Ray Eyes (Armageddon Babylon Mix)
The Boy with the X-Ray Eyes (Orchestral Mix)
The Boy with the X-Ray Eyes (X-Rated Mix)
Mervs Tune

CD Single 1 1996 EMI (CDEM 440)
The Boy with the X-Ray Eyes (7" Mix)
Mervs Tune
Spaceman (Zupervarian Mix)

CD Single 2 1996 EMI (CDEMS 440)
The Boy with the X-Ray Eyes (7" Mix)
The Boy with the X-Ray Eyes (Armageddon Babylon Mix)
The Boy with the X-Ray Eyes (X-Rated Mix)
The Boy with the X-Ray Eyes (Orchestral Mix)

References

1996 singles
Babylon Zoo songs
1995 songs
EMI Records singles
Song recordings produced by Steve Power